Jan Holub II (born 24 January 1968) is a former Czechoslovakian and Czech motorcycle speedway rider, who was started in 1986 and 1989 Under-21 World Championship.

His father Jan I was a speedway rider, who finished sixth in 1972 Speedway World Pairs Championship. His son Jan III is also a speedway rider.

Career details

World Championships 

 Individual U-21 World Championship
 1986 -  Rivne - track reserve (3 pts) as European Championship
 1989 -  Lonigo - track reserve (4 pts)

Domestic competitions 

 Team Polish Championship (League)
 1990 - 2nd place in Second League for Wrocław (Average 2.524)
 1991 - 2nd place in Second League for Częstochowa (Average 2.151)
 1992 - 8th place in Second League for Grudziądz (Average 2.091)
 1996 - 9th place in Second League for Rawicz (Average 0.917)

See also 
 Czechoslovakia national speedway team
 Czech Republic national speedway team

References 

Czechoslovak speedway riders
Czech speedway riders
1968 births
Living people
Sportspeople from České Budějovice